Coluber vittacaudatus is a species of snake found in Darjeeling, India.

Distribution
Type locality: from "vicinity of Darjiling" (= Darjeeling, 27° 02'N; 88° 16'E; West Bengal State, eastern India). Known only from the type locality.
Named after "vittacaudatus" = Latin for striped tail.

References
 Blyth, E. 1854 Notices and descriptions of various reptiles, new or little-known. Part I. J. Asiat. Soc. Bengal  22 [1853]: 639-655
 Das, Indraneil, Basudeb Dattagupta And Nemai Charan Gayen. 1998 History and catalogue of reptile types in the collection of the Zoological Survey of India. J. south Asian nat. Hist. 3 (2): 121-172

External links
 

Colubrids
Reptiles described in 1854
Taxa named by Edward Blyth